Lonely City is an album by pianist Freddie Redd recorded in 1985 and released by the Uptown label in 1989.

Reception 

In his AllMusic review, Scott Yanow states: "Pianist Freddie Redd's first recording in eight years is quite intriguing. Redd is matched with seven diverse players on six of his compositions, most of which are little-known. The music is high-quality hard bop, and the fresh material inspires the musicians. Recommended".

Track listing 
All compositions by Freddie Redd
 "After the Show" – 5:31
 "Bleeker St. Blues" – 7:26
 "Emily Reno" – 6:56
 "Thespian" – 8:26
 "Lonely City" – 7:49
 "Had Tadd in Mind" – 4:52

Personnel 
 Freddie Redd – piano
 Don Sickler – trumpet, arranger
 Clarence "C" Sharpe – alto saxophone
 Clifford Jordan – tenor saxophone
Gerry Cappuccio – baritone saxophone
George Duvivier – double bass
Ben Riley – drums

References 

1989 albums
Freddie Redd albums
Uptown Records (jazz) albums
Albums recorded at Van Gelder Studio